Specma is a company in Sweden.  It is one of Sweden's biggest producers of gaskets and seals for Swedish industry.

History
The company was founded in 1918. It was known as Specialmaskiner AB, hence the shortened name Specma. 

Specma was acquired by the Danish group  in January 2016, and in April 2022 it was consolidated into Hydra-Grene (also owned by Schouw & Co.) for a consideration of 650 million Danish Krone.

In 2019 the company opened a further 7000 square metre manufacturing facility in Stargard, Poland.

References

Manufacturing companies of Sweden
Companies based in Gothenburg